Dodge County Courthouse may refer to:

 Dodge County Courthouse (Georgia), Eastman, Georgia
 Dodge County Courthouse (Minnesota), Mantorville, Minnesota
 Dodge County Courthouse (Nebraska), Fremont, Nebraska